Iris Morales (born 1948) is an American activist for Latino/a civil rights, filmmaker, author, and lawyer based in New York. She is best known for her work with the Young Lords, a Puerto Rican community activist group in the United States and her feminist movements within the organization. Morales continues to create a space for people of color to express their voices and histories through a variety of mediums as an advocate for underrepresented people, especially those who identify as LatinX members.

Early life and education 
Iris Morales was born in New York in 1948 to Puerto Rican migrant parents. Her father worked as a hotel elevator operator, and her mother worked as a sewing machine operator.  She went to Julia Richman High School, where she attended meetings of the Student Nonviolent Coordinating Committee and the NAACP.

As the oldest of four in her family, Morales was expected to learn how to care for the house by her aunts and cousins. However, Morales' mother knew that she was capable of more than that and supported and encouraged her educational path.

In highschool, Morales was highly inspired by Malcom X and Don Pedro Alviso Compas, because there was little understood about Puerto Rican history. This, along social movements such as the Black Panther Party inspired Morales to begin her Young activist narrative. As a teenager, she became a tenant rights organizer in her East Harlem neighborhood and protested the Vietnam War. She studied political science at City College and was a part of a small program designated for underprivileged and minority students that studied at the college  At the University, Morales joined the Black student organization, and co-founded Puerto Ricans Involved in Student Action (PRISA), the school's first Puerto Rican student organization.

The Young Lords 
The Chicago-based Young Lords, a leftist group of Puerto Rican youth activists inspired by the Black Panthers, established a branch in New York in 1969. Morales joined the group that year, after meeting Young Lords founder José Cha Cha Jiménez at a conference in Denver.

Her work as a leader in the Young Lords spanned five years in the 1960s and 1970s. She served as deputy minister of education and co-founder of its Women's Caucus. Morales served as minister of information for a period. Morales resigned from the Young Lords, which was struggling with infighting and targeted by the FBI's COINTELPRO program, in 1975. The party effectively disbanded the following year.

Her contributions to the Young Lords Party was representative of her socialist and internationalist views that precedent Puerto Rican History.

Feminist Movement Contributions 
Morales worked to create a second revolution within The Young Lord's Party. Her engagement in the feminist movement was astute, as she worked to deconstruct the patriarchal sexism that followed women at the beginning of their journey in the Young Lords Party.

She along with other women of the Young Lords party disputed the machista values outlined in the 13 point program written and published by the Young Lords male members that ultimately supported machista views, pointing out the duality of their statements to that of the initiatives of The Young Lords Party.

Morales worked on political education and literacy efforts, as well as attempting to change the machista culture of the organization. She advocated for women's inclusion in leadership and helped co-found the Women's Union and its corresponding publication, La Luchadora. Her work on women's representation in the Young Lords paved the way for the organization's pioneering lesbian and gay caucus.

In addition to her fight for the feminist cause within the Young Lords, she also used her position in the organization to advocate for abortion access and against forced sterilizations, and an increase to birth control accessibility. The Women's caucus continued to advocate for safer abortions for women of underrepresented  Among the causes that the organization undertook during this period included establishing a free breakfast program for New York's youth, creating a lead poisoning prevention program, founding a daycare so Latina women could seek employment, and advocating for the decolonization of Puerto Rico.

La Luchadora 
La Luchadora was a 12 point-Program that was written and co-founded by Iris Morales. The paper was an act to promote the history of women and their rights within the Young Lords Party at a time when women were rarely highlighted. La Luchadora contested against rape and violence that existed within and outside of the organization. The Women's cuacus used this platform as a way to remove themselves from the traditional roles of women in the kitchen, and ascend into positions of action. The program was discontinued by The young Lord's leadership soon after its creation in May 1971.

The New York Times Feature 
On November 11, 1970, Iris Morales along with Denise Oliver, Nydia Mercado, and Lulu Carreras, were highlighted in The New York Times under the section titled Food, Family, and Fashion." This feature was important to the feminist movement and caucus of the Young Lords Party, because it was the first documentation and acknowledgment of women's involvements in the Mainstream Media. The article focuses on the equality to their male counterparts along with the achievements of the women's caucus. This publication, eventually inspired Morales to write her book, Through The Eyes Of Rebel Women.

Further education and career 
After leaving the Young Lords, Morales continued her efforts to improve her community's resources for the youth population, by working as a drug addiction counselor, teacher, along as a youth advocate.

After the dissolution of the Young Lords, Morales continued her Latina feminist activism and pursued a Juris Doctor degree from New York University School of Law. At NYU, she became the first Puerto Rican to receive the highly competitive Root-Tilden-Kern Scholarship, a full-tuition public service scholarship.

As a lawyer, she worked as an attorney and director of education at the Puerto Rican Legal Defense and Education Fund. She was also a co-founder and the executive director of the New Educational Opportunities Network, a media nonprofit serving young people of color. She later worked with Manhattan Neighborhood Network's community media center in Spanish Harlem and served as director of the Union Square Awards, a city government project recognizing grassroots activists.

Morales returned to school again and earned an MFA in Integrated Media Arts from Hunter College.

Continued career

Writing Works 
Morales became inspired by the stories of all LatinX community members and made it a passion of hers to continue her activism through literature. Morales's hopes are to continue to inspire the future activists with historical narratives, and anthologies of present day social issues. Morales has a number of published works of literature and has contributed to editing works of other Latinx Community members. Iris Morales founded the Red Sugarcane Press that has dedicated its purpose to continuing to publish works relating to the Latinx community.

Through The Eyes of Rebel Women, The Young Lords: 1969-1976 
Inspired by the spark created through the publication of The New York feature focusing on the female and feminist roles that she and other women up-took in the Young Lord's Party, Morales began to write Through The Eyes Of Rebel Women, The Young Lords: 1969-1976, a book that focuses on these experiences. The book was published through Red Sugarcane Press, Morales' personal small publishing house in 2012. In this book Morales includes a number of different original media forms from both movements and women interviews. Some of the women highlighted in the book include: Denise Oliver-Velez, Martha Arguello, Minerva Solla, and many more. The book explains the feminist movement within the Young Lords Party. This project allowed Morales reflect on the experiences of being a part of the party, both the pleasant and unpleasant ones alike. Morales' intentions for her book are that many are not only able to learn about the history of The Young Lords women but continue to learn lessons that continue to be applicable to the modern activist movements.

Latinas: Struggles & Protests in 21st Century 
Morales Compiled and contributed to the editing and revision of the anthology, Latinas: Struggles & Protests in 21st Century, that was published in 2018. The anthology is made up of different genres of writing that aimed to address the perspectives of Latina women and their views of gender, equality, race and political refrains in the modern society.  The anthology aims to provide a voice to those who are usually silenced and provide a platform to the underrepresented population of women.

Voices From Puerto Rico: Post-Hurricane Maria/ Voces desde Puerto Rico 
Published and edited in 2019, Morales wrote the bilingual anthology Voices From Puerto Rico: Post-Hurricane Maria/ Voces desde Puerto Rico, that highlights the perspectives of a number of activists, community organizers, and artists who reflected on the aftermath of Hurricane Maria on the island and the Puerto Rican populus. The anthology strived to expose the number of existing issues that Puerto Rico previously had that were intensified by Hurricane Maria.

Vicki and A Summer of Change! ¡Vicki y un verano de cambio! 
Published on November 30, 2020, Children's book, Vicki and A Summer of Change! ¡Vicki y un verano de cambio!, was the first children's book published by Red Sugarcane Press. As a co-author to Raquel M. Ortiz, Morales worked alongside her to create a tale that retells the Young Lord's journey and story in a digestible way for children. The story focuses on the main character Vicki who is determined to make a change in her community by joining the Young Lord's Party and serving her community. A few months later on December 5, 2020 a coloring book version of the book was published that had images from the original children's work.

Filmmaking career 
After graduating from Law school, Morales went on to practice labor and television law, and was involved in a number of organizations that strived to bring women of color into the film industry. This, essentially, was Morales' introduction to film making.

Palante Siempre Palante! 
The idea for the film occurred near the twentieth anniversary of The Young Lords. Some people were set to create books and other forms of media to commemorate the time; Iris Morales volunteered to direct the film. Palante Siempre Palante was directed by Iris Morales with the intentions of creating it for the younger generation, so that that the history could continue past the generation of the Young Lords Party. From the music to the visuals, Iris Morales made it a goal to have representation of Puerto Ricans at the time. The film aimed to educate Puerto Ricans on not only The Young Lords, but to continue to bring back the LatinX history narrative. The process of creating the film was difficult due to the lack of media in archives that would allow her to create the film. This created a drive for Morles to continue to strive for the documentation of history. Morales also made it a point to include young people, aligned with her goal of influencing the next generation. The Film was streamed through PBS in 1996 and was filmed in collaboration with Third World News Reel. The film aimed to spread the message about decolonizing Puerto Rico and to educate the younger masses.

NEON-New Educational Opportunities Network 
While working with young people (ages 18 to 26) on Public Assistance, she would hear many complaints about the lack of African-American and Latinx History. Following this, Morales formed the idea to create a training program for these young people. This idea was supported and funded in 1990s. The idea served as a means of allowing young LatinX people to find a medium and space to continue to preserve the history of their communities. However, the training Program was defunded about five years after it began.

Media Features 
Morales appeared in the 2021 New York Times documentary Takeover: How We Occupied a Hospital and Changed Public Health Care, about the 1970 Lincoln Hospital takeover through which the Young Lords requested proper funding and infrastructure to respond to overwhelming health care needs, a local tuberculosis epidemic, and other issues.

Morales continues to write about the Young Lords Party by adding forewords or adding to existing writing. One of her collaborations is highlighted throughout the foreword written for The Young Lords: A Reader.

Other Contributions 
Morales has contributed to recent scholarship on the history of the Young Lords, writing forwards for The Young Lords: A Reader in 2010 and Palante: Young Lords Party in 2011.

Special Recognition and Awards 
In 2019 Iris Morales was named one of North Star Fund's 40 for 40.

In 2020, she was honored as a Latina Trailblazer by LatinoJustice PRLDEF.

See also 

 Women of the Young Lords

References 

1948 births
Living people
Activists for Hispanic and Latino American civil rights
American documentary filmmakers
American feminists
American women writers
City College of New York alumni
Hunter College alumni
New York University School of Law alumni
People from East Harlem
Puerto Rican documentary filmmakers
Puerto Rican feminists
Puerto Rican activists
Puerto Rican women writers
Women civil rights activists
Young Lords